The 2022 HBCU Legacy Bowl was a post-season college football all-star game played on February 19, 2022, at Yulman Stadium in New Orleans, Louisiana. It was the inaugural edition of the HBCU Legacy Bowl, whose founding was announced by the Black College Football Hall of Fame on March 18, 2021. The game was the last of the all-star games that concluded the 2021–22 bowl games. Television coverage was provided by NFL Network.

The bowl's teams are named after Jake Gaither, coach of the Florida A&M Rattlers from 1945 to 1973, and Eddie Robinson, coach of the Grambling State Tigers from 1941 to 1997.

Players
Football programs representing historically black colleges and universities (HBCU) primarily compete in the Mid-Eastern Athletic Conference (MEAC) and Southwestern Athletic Conference (SWAC) in the NCAA Division I Football Championship Subdivision (FCS), the Central Intercollegiate Athletic Association (CIAA) and Southern Intercollegiate Athletic Conference (SIAC) in NCAA Division II, and the Gulf Coast Athletic Conference (GCAC) of the National Association of Intercollegiate Athletics (NAIA).

On September 1, 2021, Aqeel Glass, quarterback for the Alabama A&M Bulldogs, became the first player to be selected for the HBCU Legacy Bowl. As the 2021 season progressed, the game's website was updated with players who confirmed plans to participate in the game. Those players are listed below.

Box score
Several game-specific rules were used:
 Teams were limited to two offensive packages, 4–3 defenses, and no blitzing
 No overtime, no replay challenges, and kickoffs only at the start of each half

Source:

References

External links

 Rosters and depth chart at hbculegacybowl.com
 HBCU Legacy Bowl Highlights via YouTube

HBCU Legacy Bowl
American football competitions in New Orleans
HBCU Legacy Bowl
HBCU Legacy Bowl
College football bowls in Louisiana